State Road 200 (NM 200) is a  state highway in the US state of New Mexico. NM 200's western terminus is at U.S. Route 285 (US 285) northwest of Carlsbad, and the eastern terminus is at US 62 and US 180 east of Carlsbad.

Major intersections

See also

References

200
Transportation in Eddy County, New Mexico